Ascension to the Throne is a turn-based strategy game with RPG elements. It was developed by the Ukrainian video game company DVS and was released on January 26 2007 for Microsoft Windows.

Gameplay
Gameplay is divided into two aspects, either a free roaming environment where the player wanders around and interacts with various NPCs and hostile encounters, which are usually denoted by a circle around the enemy party radius, or a hex-based traditional turn-based strategy during battles. In battles, the player controls his entire party.

Plot
The player assumes the role of the last offspring of the ancient family Illiar, which has ruled the kingdom of Eden for ages. After the enemies of the dynasty attacked their castle, they slaughtered the prince's entire family and destroyed his settlement. Before they could kill him, a powerful spell threw the prince to a land far beyond his country, where he was left on his own without any relatives, friends, army or money. The prince has taken a vow of vengeance, to gain enough power and followers to return to his usurped lands and reclaim them - by force.

Sequel
A sequel was released on August 29 2008, dubbed Ascension to the Throne: Valkyrie.

References

2007 video games
1C Company games
Turn-based strategy video games
Video games developed in Russia
Role-playing video games
Windows games
Windows-only games